Commodity Classification Automated Tracking System (CCATS) is an alphanumeric code assigned by the United States  Bureau of Industry and Security (BIS) to products that it has classified under the Export Administration Regulations (EAR). Software companies provide the CCATS number because some encryption exports require the exporter to make post-shipment reporting to BIS on a bi-annual basis and the CCATS number is one of the mandatory elements required for reporting.

References
Bureau of Industry and Security
Guidelines for requesting commodity classification

Freight transport
Foreign trade of the United States